Rebel Heart is a 2015 album released by American singer Madonna.

Rebel Heart or Rebel Hearts may also refer to:

Music
 Rebel Heart Tour, a 2015–16 tour in support of the Madonna album
 Rebel Heart (Dan Seals album), 1983
 Rebel Heart Tour (album), a 2017 live album of the Madonna tour
 "Rebel Heart" (instrumental), an instrumental by The Corrs (2000)
 "Rebel Heart", a song by Rod Stewart from Vagabond Heart (1991)
 "Rebel Heart", a song by Kane Roberts from Saints and Sinners (1991)
 "Rebel Heart", a song by Roots Manuva from Awfully Deep (2005)
 "Rebel Heart" (song), the title track from the Madonna album (2015)
 "Rebel Heart", a song by The Shelters from their self-titled debut album (2016)
 "Rebel Heart", a song by Lauren Daigle from Look Up Child (2018)
 "Rebel Hearts", an Irish rebel song
 "Rebel Hearts", a song by Hilary Duff from Breathe In. Breathe Out. (2015)
 "Rebel Heart", a song by First Aid Kit from Ruins (2018)

Other uses
 Rebel Heart, autobiography of Bebe Buell 2002
 Rebel Heart, a 2012 teen novel by Moira Young
 Rebel Heart (TV series), a 2001 BBC drama miniseries set during the Irish War of Independence from 1916